"Before My Eyes" is a song by recording artist A-Lee from his second studio album, Forever Lost (2012). It was released on November 11, 2011 in Norway, on EE Records and Columbia/Sony Music Norway.  A-Lee worked with producers Ground Rules.

"Before My Eyes" is A-Lee's fourth single and it sold Gold in Norway. It received great radio attention in Norway.

The music video of single "Before My Eyes" was released on January 14, 2012. It was filmed in Oslo, Norway. Special effects were used in the music video.

Track listing

Personnel
 Björn Engelmann – mastering
 Shahrouz Ghafourian – executive producer, management
 Bjarte Giske – producer, engineer, mixer, additional vocals
 Marori Morningstar – photography
 Morten Pape – producer, engineer, mixer
 Ali Pirzad-Amoli – vocals, executive producer, artwork design
 Olav Verpe – additional vocals

Chart positions and certifications

Release history

Music videos

External links
 A-Lee Official Site

References 

2011 singles
2011 songs